The 2012 FIFA Ballon d'Or Gala was the third year for FIFA's awards for the top football players and coaches of the year. The awards were given out in Zürich on 7 January 2013, with Lionel Messi winning a record fourth consecutive Ballon d'Or.

The gala ceremony was hosted by former Ballon d'Or winner Ruud Gullit and broadcast journalist Kay Murray of Real Madrid TV and Fox Soccer.

Winners and nominees

FIFA Ballon d'Or

A shortlist of 23 male players was compiled by members of FIFA's Football Committee as well as a group of experts from France Football. It was announced on 29 October 2012.
There were three voters per FIFA member federation, one journalist and the coaches and captain of the national men's team. Each picked a first (5 points), second (3 points) and third choice (1 point), with their choices made public by FIFA. This was cut to a set of three "finalists" – Lionel Messi, Andrés Iniesta and Cristiano Ronaldo – on 29 November 2012.

The odds-on favourite Lionel Messi won the award. Messi won all three FIFA Ballons d'Or since its inception in 2010 and also won both predecessor awards (the Ballon d'Or and FIFA World Player of the Year) in 2009.

The results for the 2012 FIFA Ballon d'Or were:

The following 20 men were originally in contention for the 2012 FIFA Ballon d’Or:

FIFA Women's World Player of the Year
On 25 October 2012, a ten-player shortlist was unveiled for the FIFA's Women's Player of the Year, which was chosen by experts from FIFA's Committee for Women's Football and the FIFA Women's World Cup and a group of experts from France Football.

The voting system used was the same as that of the men's award (see above), with coaches and captains of women's national teams and persons from the media making public top-three selections.

FIFA World Coach of the Year for Men's Football 
This award was decided by the same voters and system as that of the men's player award.

FIFA World Coach of the Year for Women's Football 
This award was decided by the same voters and system as that of the women's player award.

FIFA/FIFPro World XI

This was the first occasion that all 11 FIFPro World XI players were players from the same league (La Liga).

FIFA Puskás Award 
The Puskás Award for best goal was decided by a public online vote.

FIFA Presidential Award 
 Franz Beckenbauer

FIFA Fair Play Award 
 Uzbekistan Football Federation

References

External links

2012 in association football
FIFA Ballon d'Or
2012 sports awards
2012–13 in Swiss football
Women's association football trophies and awards
2012 in women's association football